Stade Clermontois Basket Auvergne was a French professional basketball club based in Clermont-Ferrand. The team was active in the second division LNB Pro B for several years, as well as some years in the first division LNB Pro A.

In 2015, the club merged with JA Vichy to create JA Vichy-Clermont Métropole.

External links
Official site

References

ClermontFerrand
Basketball teams established in 1938
Sport in Clermont-Ferrand